Sweet Child was a 1968 double album by the British folk-rock band Pentangle: Terry Cox, Bert Jansch, Jacqui McShee, John Renbourn and Danny Thompson.

Background
One disk of the double album was recorded at Pentangle's live concert in the Royal Festival Hall, which took place on 29 June 1968; the other was recorded in the studio. The material is the most wide-ranging of Pentangle's albums, including folk songs, jazz classics, blues, early music and Pentangle's own compositions. The album cover was designed by Peter Blake, better-known for his design of The Beatles' Sgt. Pepper's Lonely Hearts Club Band album.

Reception
In his retrospective review for Allmusic, Matthew Greenwald called the album, "probably the most representative of their work... In all, Sweet Child is an awesome and delightful collection, and probably their finest hour."

Track listing

Charts

Personnel
Pentangle
Jacqui McShee - vocals
Bert Jansch - acoustic guitar, vocals
John Renbourn - acoustic guitar, vocals
Danny Thompson - double bass
Terry Cox - drums, glockenspiel, vocals
Technical
Peter Blake - design

Released versions

Sweet Child was originally released in the UK, as a double LP, on 1 November 1968 as Transatlantic TRA178. The US release, in the same year, was Reprise  2R56334. A CD version was released in 1992 as Line TACD9005. Some of the stage banter in the live section has been cut from this version. In 2001, a digitally remastered version was released  as Castle CMDDD132, including several versions of some of the studio takes and some additional songs from the Festival Hall concert: "Hear my Call", "Let No Man Steal Your Thyme", "Bells", "Travelling Song", "Waltz", "Way Behind The Sun" and "Go and Catch a Falling Star".

References 

1968 albums
Pentangle (band) albums
Albums produced by Shel Talmy
1968 live albums
Transatlantic Records albums
Transatlantic Records live albums
Albums with cover art by Peter Blake (artist)
Albums recorded at IBC Studios